Alejandro Aranda (born August 11, 1994), known by his stage name Scarypoolparty, is an American singer, musician, and reality television personality from Pomona, California, and runner-up on the seventeenth season of American Idol. His debut album Exit Form was released on November 22, 2019.  His follow-up album length EP, Doom Hologram was released on September 4, 2020. L.A. was released 2021. The Act of Forgiveness/a double  Album was released in 2021 also.

Early life
Musically, Aranda's early influences included classical music like Beethoven, Bach and Chopin, along with Dead Can Dance, Nine Inch Nails and other classical and contemporary artists.

In 2017, Aranda won Artist of the Year with CSUN and Five of Five Entertainment. It was from here that he started gaining traction in the world of music.

Aranda's American Idol audition in front of the judges was aired on ABC on March 6, 2019.  He was the only contestant to play seven original songs in the show's history, even though producers encouraged him to play cover versions.

American Idol
He received a private audition through someone who attended a backyard concert that he performed, and on April 6, 2019, he auditioned on Season 17 of American Idol  in Los Angeles, CA.  Alejandro performed two original songs, “Out Loud” and “Cholo Love.”  Immediately, the judges were drawn to him. Luke Bryan said, “I just feel like I’m in the presence of greatness.” and “It was like watching my favorite movie that I did not want to end.” Katy Perry said, “Okay Alejandro, I think you're the winner.  I think you're really special.  I think you're an absolute genius.”

His audition video was released on February 6, 2019, and as of August 22, 2019 it had reached 14 million YouTube views, 8.5 million more than any other Season 17 contestant's audition.  On March 16, 2019, Stevie Nicks wrote (on Instagram) a prophecy saying he will “perform across great stages of the world” and “...let me welcome you to the grand stage that will be your home for the rest of your extraordinary life.”

Aranda performed seven different original songs.  He played "10 Years" on American Idol in Hollywood Week and also in the finale with an orchestra, making him the only contestant to perform four original songs in the finale of the show.  In total, he played seven original songs on the show.

Post-American Idol

2019 to present
During the Hometown Heroes Concert in Pomona, California, the mayor of Pomona declared May 19, 2019 "Alejandro Aranda Day".

Following his exit from American Idol, Aranda was scheduled to go on a seven-date US tour in July 2019. Tickets went on sale on the morning of May 23, every show sold out in under 15 minutes.  American Idol judge Katy Perry jokingly begged Aranda to be a "roadie" on his tour.

He announced on June 1, that he would put on a free concert in Nashville on July 3, joined by Bizz & Everyday People. Along with that, he announced that he was working on another tour. He met Darren King at the Nashville show. Being a long-time fan of MuteMath, it was a great opportunity to play on the road with Darren King and his wife Sucre during the 2019 Fall Tour.

He released the single "Tonight" under the name Scarypoolparty on June 28, 2019, after signing with Hollywood Records. The song was co-written and co-produced by Twin Shadow. "Tonight" was performed on American Idol during the auditions as well as April 15, 2019 during the top 14 results show.

On August 7, 2019, he released the ballad "Cholo Love".  Cholo Love was played during the audition and again during the Wildcard Episode on April 15, 2019.  He wrote and produced this song for Exit Form with his friend and mentor Twin Shadow.

Shortly before the show in Independence Day show in Nashville, Tennessee, Aranda announced on June 23 that he was working on a new album, and on June 24, he announced he would go on a twenty-eight stop tour from October 10 to November 21.  On June 25, he added a twenty-ninth stop in Los Angeles for November 22.

In addition to the Fall tour dates, he performed at several music festivals, including Lollapalooza in Chicago on August 3, 2019, Life Is Beautiful in September 2019 and Austin City Limits Music Festival in October 2019. On June 25, he added a twenty-ninth stop in Los Angeles for the Fall Tour.

He released the single "Diamonds" on October 4, 2019, along with a YouTube video and Behind the Scenes video.  Perhaps his grittiest song to date.  It was to set the stage for upcoming albums and a separation from the Idol image that was created and often in conflict with his emerging Scarypoolparty alter ego.

'Exit Form', his debut album was announced on November 5, 2019, and released on November 22, 2019.

In 2020 some his European tour was canceled.  He was featured on Lollapalooza's 2020 online festival, which showed previously recorded concert sets.

On March 2, 2021, Scarypoolparty released a collaborative single with Nothing,Nowhere. The song is a precursor to Scarypoolparty's 2021 EP titled Los Angeles which will release worldwide on March 26.

On August 27, 2021, Aranda released a 21-song album, The Act of Forgiveness.  He collaborated with composer Rob Mathes on an 18-piece orchestra, adding orchestral arrangements on 12 of the album's tracks.

The Beautiful Liar tour with X Ambassadors and Taylor Janzen began on October 15, 2021.  Scarypoolparty performed six to seven songs at each show on the US leg of the tour.  Taylor Janzen opened the shows, Scarypoolparty followed her, and X Ambassadors were the main act.  X Ambassadors have several number one hits including Popular Monster, Unsteady, and Renegades.  X Ambassadors continued on to Europe.

Personal life
Alejandro Aranda was born on August 11, 1994, in Pomona, California. In an interview with Launch Left, he talked about his family and the fact that he was not close to them.

Tours

Discography

Studio albums

Extended plays

Singles

References

1994 births
Living people
American male singer-songwriters
Guitarists from California
Singer-songwriters from California
21st-century American male singers
21st-century American singers
American Idol participants
Hollywood Records artists
People from Pomona, California